TCQ or tcq may refer to:

 Tagged Command Queuing
 Coronel FAP Carlos Ciriani Santa Rosa International Airport (IATA code : TCQ)
 Kaiy language (ISO 639-3 alpha-3 code : tcq)